Grover Clinton Tyler (October 11, 1892 – October 2, 1966) was an aeronautical pioneer who flew as an airmail pilot in the 1920s and 1930s, and one of only ten recipients of the Airmail Flyers' Medal of Honor.

Career
Tyler is one of two pilots that started service with the Pacific Air Transport in 1926 flying along the west coast between Canada and Mexico. He is credited with flying the last leg, from Portland to Seattle, Washington, of a historic five-leg trip between Los Angeles, California, and Seattle, establishing the flight of the Pacific Coast Airways. Landing his biplane at Gorst Field, he handed over the first sack of mail on this new commercial route to Postmaster C. M. Perkins on 15 September 1926. To prepare the route for night flying Tyler and fellow pilot Arthur Starbuck, the other original pilot staff of PAT, drove an old Ford up and down the San Joaquin Valley setting up airway beacon lights with a pick and shovel. By 1928 the PAT had become a unit of Boeing Systems and Tyler continued flying the mail as well as passengers on this new route he had helped to establish.

Flight incident
On the night of March 2, 1931, while flying along the very route he had helped establish, a fire broke out on board his aircraft, a Boeing 40-B-4, and Tyler had to make an emergency landing near Roseburg, Oregon.  For his actions that night President Franklin Delano Roosevelt on 29 October 1935 presented Tyler, along with 6 other pilots, with the Airmail Flyers' Medal of Honor.  This very deed was later chronicled on the well known "Wheaties" cereal box as part of a 1930s era series regarding the Air Mail Flyers Medal of Honor recipients.

Medal from the President
29 October 1935 at a ceremony (12:00 - 12:15) in the White House Tyler was one of seven aviators awarded the Airmail Flyers’ Medal of Honor by president Franklin Delano Roosevelt for extraordinary achievement.  All seven of the pilots saved the mail in hazardous landings.

Present at the ceremony were: President, Franklin Delano Roosevelt; Postmaster General, James A Farley; Lewis S Turner of Fort Worth, Texas; James H Carmichael, Jr. of Detroit, Michigan; Edward A Bellande of Los Angeles, California; Gordon S Darnell of Kansas City, Missouri; Willington P McFail of Murfreesboro, Tennessee; Roy H Warner of Portland, Oregon; And Grover Tyler of Seattle, Washington.  Bellande's deed was chronicled on the well known Wheaties cereal box cover as part of a series of 8 box covers regarding the feats of pilot's awarded the Air Mail Flyers Medal of Honor.

Medal citation

Death
Tyler died in 1966 just months after attending the dedication of a fountain at 5500 W. Marginal Way S. W. in Portland, Oregon marking the location of his historic landing 40 years earlier.

References

External links
 Southern Oregon Historical Society (SOHS)
 SOHS photo listings for Grover Tyler
 JOMSA article 1990 Vol. 141.3.13
 JOMSA article 1953 May - Aug
 JOMSA article 1966 Vol. 17.12.7
 Chicago Tribune article Nov. 3, 1935
 Library of Congress image: FDR presenting medal to 7 pilots
 Find A Grave memorial of Grover Tyler

1966 deaths
1892 births
United States airmail pilots
General Mills people
Medals